High Peak Buses Limited is a bus company based in Dove Holes, Derbyshire, formed in 2012. It operates a mixture of local and long-distance commercial and subsidised public bus services in and around the Borough of High Peak, after which it is named.

History
In April 2012 Centrebus and Wellglade Group entered a 50/50 joint venture. This saw Bowers Coaches and Trentbarton's Buxton operations combined based at the latter's Dove Holes depot.

Services
High Peak operates all services previously run by Bowers Coaches and the Buxton depot of Trent Barton, including:
 Skyline 199 service from Buxton to Stockport and Manchester Airport
 Transpeak from Buxton, Bakewell, Matlock then onto Belper & Derby, 
 Other local services serve Glossop, New Mills, Whaley Bridge, Ashbourne and Marple.

Fleet
Most of the fleet wear the Centrebus corporate livery although the vehicles used on Skyline199 and Transpeak which have dedicated branded vehicles.
Skyline199 has a dedicated fleet of 7 Mercedes-Benz Citaros while Transpeak uses 4 Enviro200s .

High Peak have recently added two ADL Enviro200MMCs as part of an upgrade to their fleet which all have space saving features.

Depot
High Peak has a fleet of around 50 vehicles all based at the former Trent Barton depot in Dove Holes and employs over 100 people.

References

External links

Flickr gallery

Bus operators in Derbyshire
High Peak, Derbyshire